Asin (born 1985) is an Indian actress.

Asin or ASIN may also refer to:
 Arcsine, an inverse trigonometric function
 Asin (band), a Filipino rock band
 Asín (surname)
 Asín, a municipality in Spain
 Asin de Broto, a village in Broto, Spain
 Amazon Standard Identification Number, used by Amazon.com to identify its products
 Asin of Baekje (died 405), king of Baekje
 Asin, Bhamo, Burma